Ogilbia galapagosensis, the Galapagos cuskeel, is a species of fish in the family Bythitidae. It is only known from four brackish-water cave systems on Santa Cruz Island, Galápagos, Ecuador. Although usually called a cavefish, it has been argued that this label is inaccurate, as the places it inhabit also can be described as lagoon crevices.

References

Bythitidae
Cave fish
Endemic fauna of the Galápagos Islands
Taxonomy articles created by Polbot
Fish described in 1965